Suffomyia is a genus of beach flies in the family Canacidae. All known species are Australasian or African.

Species 
S. dancei Munari, 2008
S. scutellaris Freidberg, 1995
S. ismayi McAlpine, 2007
S. sabroskyi McAlpine, 2007

References 

Canacidae
Carnoidea genera